Rodrigo Gudiño is a Mexican Canadian film director and editor, known for being the founder of the horror magazine and company Rue Morgue. He currently serves as the company's president and also helps coordinate and program for several of the festivals and events that Rue Morgue holds or sponsors. Gudiño previously worked as the magazine's editor-in-chief before leaving the position to focus on making films. His short films were collected into the DVD Curious Stories, Crooked Symbols in 2009.

Gudiño was born in San Diego, California before moving to Tijuana at a young age. He began creating films in 2006 with the short The Eyes of Edward James and saw filmmaker Alejandro Jodorowsky as an influence on his work. Gudiño has also stated that his Catholic upbringing also influenced his work, and has remarked that he started his directing with short films released directly to film festival circuits as he wanted to "[develop] his 
abilities from an artistic standpoint" before moving to feature-length films.

Filmography

Shorts
The Eyes of Edward James (2006)
The Demonology of Desire (2007)
The Facts in the Case of Mister Hollow (2008, with Vincent Marcone)

Collections 
 Curious Stories, Crooked Symbols (2009, collects his three short films)

Feature films
The Last Will and Testament of Rosalind Leigh (2012)
The Breach (2022)

Television
 Darknet (2014, one episode)

Interviews
Why Horror? (2014, as himself)

References

External links
 
 

People from San Diego
Year of birth missing (living people)
Living people
Film directors from California